Pochvennichestvo (roughly "return to the native soil", from почва "soil") was a late 19th-century movement in Russia that tied in closely with its contemporary ideology, Slavophilia.

History
The Slavophiles and the Pochvennichestvo supported the complete emancipation of serfdom, stressed a strong desire to return to the idealised past of Russian history, and opposed Europeanization. They also chose a complete rejection of the nihilist, classical liberal and Marxist movements of the time. Their primary focus was to change Russian society by the humbling of the self and social reform through the Russian Orthodox Church, rather than the radical implementations of the intelligentsia. 

The major differences between the Slavophiles and the Pochvennichestvo were that the former detested the Westernisation policies of Peter the Great, but the latter praised what were seen as the benefits of the notorious ruler who maintained a strong patriotic mentality for Orthodoxy, Autocracy, and Nationality. Another major difference was that many of the leaders of Pochvennichestvo and supporters adopted a militant anti-Protestant, anti-Catholic and antisemitic stance.

The movement had its roots in the works of the German philosopher Johann Gottfried Herder, who focused primarily on emphasising the differences among people and regional cultures. In addition, it rejected the universalism of the Enlightenment period. The most prominent Russian intellectuals who founded the movement were Nikolay Strakhov, Nikolay Danilevsky and Konstantin Leontyev.

Fyodor Dostoyevsky also held such views, as he expressed in his novel Demons. The ideology was later adopted by Tsars Alexander III and Nicholas II.

See also
Ivan Ilyin
Narodism
Westernizer, advocacy of Westernisation in Russia
Völkisch movement

Notes

References 
 "Loose and Baggy Spirits: Reading Dostoevsky and Mendeleev." - Michael Gordin, May–June 1999. Stanford University.

Anti-Catholicism
Anti-Protestantism
Antisemitism in Russia
Russian nationalism
Society of the Russian Empire
Political theories
Far-right politics in Russia
Russian philosophy